Nayara Energy (pronounced na-yaa-raa -ˈnæ.ˈjɑː rə)  is a downstream company of international scale with prominence across the hydrocarbon value chain from Refining to Retail. Nayara Energy’s single site refinery at Vadinar, Gujarat contains a capacity of 20MMTPA, making it the second largest in India. On the globally accepted scale of 1-20 , the complexity of Nayara Energy refineries goes to 11.8 making it one of the world’s most modern and complex refineries, amongst the highest globally.  The refinery is supported by end-to-end captive infrastructure including SBM (Single Buoy Mooring), crude oil tanker facility, water intake facilities, a multi-fuel power plant, product jetty and dispatch facilities (rail, road, and sea). Nayara Energy is rapidly growing as a private fuel retail network in India, with over 6,000 operational retail outlets. 

Nayara Energy plans to build one of the largest integrated petrochemicals complexes in the country. Under Phase-1 of its petrochemical expansion project, Nayara Energy is setting up a 450 KTPA capacity Polypropylene plant at its Vadinar refinery in Gujarat. This plant will include a Propylene Recovery Unit along with upgrades to the existing FCC Unit (Fluidized Catalytic Cracking Unit) and a Polypropylene Unit (PPU). The company expects production of Phase-1 of its first petrochemical product i.e. Polypropylene by Q4 of 2023.

The company holds core beliefs in driving inclusive growth and delivering value for their stakeholders. Nayara Energy has taken various initiatives in improving many communities through projects in areas of Health & Nutrition, Education & Skill Development, and Sustainable Livelihoods.

In their efforts to transition to greener sources of energy and commit to reducing their carbon footprint, Nayara has transitioned 300 of their retail outlets to solar power, enhancing environment sustainability.

History 
Nayara Energy operates the second-largest refinery in India. It is located in Vadinar, Devbhoomi Dwarka District, a few kilometers away from the world's largest refining complex (Jamnagar Refinery of Reliance Industries)

It was a publicly traded company (  and  ) until it was taken private in a leveraged buyout which closed on 30 December 2015. It was delisted valued at ₹380 billion (US$5.3 billion).

In August 2017, Rosneft Singapore Pte Limited (49.13%) and Kesani Enterprises Company Limited (49.13%) acquired 98.26% equity stake in Nayara Energy, along with captive port and power assets. Kesani Enterprises Company Limited is owned by Trafigura Holdings Pte Ltd (49%), United Capital Partners PE Investments Ltd (49%), and Oil Holdings Ltd (2%). In 2018, they renamed the company to Nayara Energy, from the Hindi word naya (new) and the English word era.

See also 
 Vadinar Refinery
 Essar Group

References

External links
 Essar Oil BSE listing

Rosneft
Essar Group
Oil and gas companies of India
Companies based in Mumbai
Non-renewable resource companies established in 1969
Indian companies established in 1969
Companies formerly listed on the Bombay Stock Exchange
1969 establishments in Maharashtra
Companies listed on the National Stock Exchange of India
Companies listed on the Bombay Stock Exchange